Pyhäjärvi (Saarijärvi) is a medium-sized lake of Central Finland, located in the northern side of Saarijärvi municipality's center. It belongs to Kymijoki mean catchment area. Pyhäjärvi (meaning: Holy lake) is very common name in Finland. There are 39 lakes with the same name.

See also
List of lakes in Finland

References

Lakes of Äänekoski
Lakes of Saarijärvi